Anoteropsis is a genus of wolf spiders. All the species except one are found in New Zealand and its islands.

Their body size ranges from 4.2 to 17.4 mm.

Species
, the World Spider Catalog accepted the following extant species:

Anoteropsis adumbrata (Urquhart, 1887) – New Zealand (mainland, Stewart Is.)
Anoteropsis aerescens (Goyen, 1887) – New Zealand
Anoteropsis alpina Vink, 2002 – New Zealand
Anoteropsis arenivaga (Dalmas, 1917) – New Zealand
Anoteropsis blesti Vink, 2002 – New Zealand
Anoteropsis canescens (Goyen, 1887) – New Zealand
Anoteropsis cantuaria Vink, 2002 – New Zealand
Anoteropsis flavescens L. Koch, 1878 (type species) – New Zealand
Anoteropsis forsteri Vink, 2002 – New Zealand (mainland, Stewart Is.)
Anoteropsis hallae Vink, 2002 – New Zealand
Anoteropsis hilaris (L. Koch, 1877) – New Zealand (mainland, Stewart Is., Auckland Is.)
Anoteropsis insularis Vink, 2002 – New Zealand (Chatham Is., Pitt Is.)
Anoteropsis lacustris Vink, 2002 – New Zealand
Anoteropsis litoralis Vink, 2002 – New Zealand
Anoteropsis montana Vink, 2002 – New Zealand
Anoteropsis okatainae Vink, 2002 – New Zealand
Anoteropsis papuana Thorell, 1881 – New Guinea
Anoteropsis ralphi (Simon, 1905) – New Zealand (Chatham Is.)
Anoteropsis senica (L. Koch, 1877) – New Zealand (mainland, Stewart Is.)
Anoteropsis urquharti (Simon, 1898) – New Zealand
Anoteropsis virgata (Karsch, 1880) – Polynesia
Anoteropsis westlandica Vink, 2002 – New Zealand

Distribution
Anoteropsis is known mainly from New Zealand including the Chatham Islands, Snares Islands and Auckland Islands. New Zealand has 27 species of wolf spiders in 6 genera. The genus Anoteropsis dominates the country with 21 species alone. One species, Anoteropsis virgata, is native to Polynesia.

References

External links
 Vink, C.J. (2002). Fauna of New Zealand 44: Lycosidae (Arachnida: Araneae). Lincoln, N.Z.: Manaaki Whenua Press  

Lycosidae
Spiders of Oceania
Araneomorphae genera